van Steen is a surname. Notable people with the surname include:

 Gonda Van Steen (born 1964), Belgian-American classical scholar and linguist
 Jac van Steen (born 1956), Dutch conductor
 Jean van Steen (born 1929), Belgian footballer

See also
 Van der Steen

Surnames of Dutch origin